The Yaa Asantewaa Museum is a museum in Ejisu Municipal District in Ghana. It was built to honor Ashanti leader Yaa Asantewaa, who was the queen mother of Ejisu.

The museum was established in 2000, to mark the centenary of the Yaa Asantewaa War. It aimed to recreate a typical Asante royal residence from ca. 1900.

In 2004 the museum was gutted by a fire. Most of its relics that were inside were destroyed, and only a few clay pots remained. As a result of the fire and closure of the museum, tourism within the area significantly decreased.

In October 2009, local leaders expressed a desire to refurbish the museum, and in 2016 UNICEF agreed to contribute US$10 million towards its reconstruction. The new facility will be constructed on a 14-acre plot of land.

See also 

 List of museums in Ghana

References

Museums in Ghana
Museums established in 2000
Monuments and memorials to women
2000 establishments in Ghana
Ashanti Region